Lycée Condorcet is a sixth-form college/senior high school in Montreuil, Seine-Saint-Denis, France in the Paris metropolitan area.

References

External links
 Lycée Condorcet 
 Lycée Condorcet  (Archive)

Lycées in Seine-Saint-Denis